Discovery Networks Deutschland was a branch of Discovery Networks Europe holding responsibility for overseeing Discovery Networks brands in Germany, Austria and German-speaking parts of Switzerland.Discovery Networks Deutschland's key operations are the free-to-air DMAX, Discovery Channel, Animal Planet and Discovery HD. Previously, Discovery Networks Deutschland operated Discovery Geschichte a channel based on historical events.

Like other Discovery channels in Europe. Discovery Networks Deutschland utilize existing productions from Discovery Networks Europe and Discovery Communications.

Current operations
In 2007, Discovery Networks Europe decided to localize its networks across Europe. This resulted in the establishment of Discovery Discovery Networks Deutschland, Discovery Networks Benelux, Discovery Networks Nordic, Discovery Networks UK & Ireland and Discovery Networks Italia and Discovery Networks EMEA (which served all other territories). As of 2011, operations in the United Kingdom, Republic of Ireland, Germany, Italy, Sweden, Denmark, Norway, Finland, France and Flanders are operated by Discovery Networks Western Europe. All other operations in Europe are operated by Discovery Networks CEEMEA in Warsaw.

In early 2011, Discovery International restructured its operations in Europe. In February 2011, it established two key branches which resulted in the amalgamation of its localized networks in Europe.

Discovery Networks Western Europe
Discovery Networks CEEMEA

Discovery Networks Deutschland 
 DMAX
 Discovery Channel
 Animal Planet
 Discovery HD

DMAX 

DMAX is a men's lifestyle channel operated by Discovery Networks Deutschland free-to-air in Germany, Austria and Switzerland. Though the channel is widely available throughout the rest of Europe, it is seen as the only free-to-air mainstream channel with a focus on non-fiction entertainment, unique in German media.

XXP origins
 DMAX is the Discovery Communications creation from the originally German sourced and owned station XXP. Discovery purchased XXP on 1 January 2006. DMAX was launched as a free-to-air channel from 1 September, targeted towards men.
 Its name was invented by Discovery Creative Director James Gilbey who asked design agencies to submit names in an innovative competition. RedBee based in London were the winning agency.
 DMAX focuses on men's hobbies, and its range of programmes is aimed at men looking for more than the current offer of sports and news programmes. DMAX involves a mix of adventure and discovery, cars and technology, popular science, DIY and travel. DMAX does not include football or erotic programmes.
 Patrick Hörl is Managing Director, while Katja Hofem-Best, who comes from RTL II, is CEO.

Additional DMAX channels 
With the success of the German-speaking DMAX a separate channel was launched for the UK and Ireland markets on 22 November 2007.

Some programmes shown on DMAX
 Was geht? Experiment am Limit (What works? Experiments at the limits) - gives solutions for childhood dreams and daily problems. e.g.: can a gun be fired underwater?
 Die Ludolfs – 4 Brüder auf'm Schrottplatz (The Ludolfs – four brothers at the scrapyard) - observes Peter, Manni, Uwe and Günther eating pasta and fiddling around on broken cars
 D Tech - presenter Daniel Hartwich takes viewers through the world of knowledge in an entertainment
 Fish ’n’ Fun - entertains with beautiful landscape shots, reveals fishing tricks and shows men how to make a delicious dish out of their catch. The male desire for adventure is also satisfied, for example with the documentary series on crab fishers in Alaska’s waters
 D Motor - presented by Tim Schrick and Sabine Schmitz, who has to prove her own driving skill against an opponent on her local race track, the Nürburgring
 Moneycoach – Rette dein Geld (Money coach – save your money) - presenter Michael Requardt helps viewers out of their debt trap

The channel also features many of Discovery Communications global programs, including:
An Idiot Abroad
 American Chopper
 30 Days - with Morgan Spurlock
 Monster Garage - with Jesse James
 Louis Theroux
 Miami Ink
 GQ TV - based on the same format as the popular men's magazine
 Jack Osbourne: Adrenaline Junkie - a British reality series focusing on Jack Osbourne's globe-trekking six-month quest to get in physical and mental shape to climb the rockface of California's El Capitan mountain
 Long Way Round - documentary television series of the 19,000 mile journey of Ewan McGregor and Charley Boorman from London to New York City on motorcycles. They travelled eastwards through Europe and Asia, flew to Alaska and continued by road from there to New York.
 Magnum, P.I. - drama series starring Tom Selleck as Thomas Magnum, a successful private investigator.
 Teleshopping broadcasts when DMAX is off air.

Discovery Channel 

Discovery Channel is the German version of the Discovery Channel. It is operated by Discovery Networks Deutschland, which is located in Munich.

It was launched on August 26, 1996 on the DF1 satellite platform. Back then, the channel was a joint-venture between Kirch Media and Discovery Communications. After DF1 merged with Premiere World in 1999, it remained on the new Premiere platform.

Kirch Media went bankrupt in 2002 and Discovery Communications subsequently became the sole owner of the channel.

The channel was later joined by sister channel with the launch on Animal Planet in 2004, Discovery Geschichte in 2005 and Discovery HD in 2006.

Discovery Channel was exclusively available through Premiere until 2009, when a new agreement was entered between Premiere and Discovery. The new contract allows the Discovery Channel to broadcast from other providers from July 1 and means that Animal Planet and Discovery Geschichte would disappear from Premiere.

Animal Planet

Animal Planet Germany is a television channel broadcasting programmes about animals, nature and wildlife to Germany, Austria and Switzerland.

An agreement to launch the channel exclusively on the Premiere platform was signed by Discovery Networks Deutschland and Premiere in October 2003. The channel launched at 9 p.m. och March 31, 2004. The new Animal Planet logo was adopted in November 2008.

On June 30, 2009, the channel will disappear from the Premiere platform and be replaced by its competitor Nat Geo Wild. This was the result of a new contract between Premiere and Discovery Networks in anticipation of Premiere's relaunch as Sky Deutschland in July. With the new contract the channel will be able to launch on other platforms. It will be available from cable provider Unitymedia's digital cable network from July 1.

References

External links
 Discovery Networks Germany Advertising Website
 DMAX
 Discovery Channel in German
 Animal Planet in German

Television in Germany
Television in Austria
Television in Switzerland
Mass media companies established in 2005
Television channels and stations established in 2005
2005 establishments in Germany